Ski ballet is a form of ballet performed on skis.  It is very similar to figure skating, combining spins, jumps, and flips in a two-minute routine choreographed to music.  It was part of the professional freestyle skiing tours of the 1970s and 1980s and then an official FIS and Olympic discipline until the year 2000. Ski ballet became known as Acroski in the 1990s in an effort to legitimize its place among the competitive ski community, especially to the FIS. It is no longer a part of competitive freestyle skiing.

Overview 
Ski ballet involved a choreographed routine of flips, rolls, leg crossings, jumps, and spins performed on a smooth slope. After the mid-1970s, the routine was performed to music for 90 seconds. For a short period of time (in the 1980s), there were also pair ballet competitions, a variation of ballet where two people performed tricks that not only included spins, jumps, and leg crossing, but also lifts and synchronic movements. A panel of judges scored the performance similarly to figure skating.

Notable athletes

Suzy Chaffee 
Following her ski-racing career, Suzy Chaffee modelled in New York with Ford Models and then became the pre-eminent freestyle ballet skier of the early 1970s. She is perhaps best known by the nickname, Suzy Chapstick, from the 1970s, when she was a spokesperson for ChapStick lip balm.

Genia Fuller 
At the 1974 Freestyle Championship, Genia Fuller was the first person ever to win all four disciplines at one event (aerials, moguls, ballet, and combined). With a background in figure skating, she finished second in her first national junior freestyle contest at age 16. Unlike other competitors, she performed ski ballet without ski poles.

Lane Spina 
Lane Spina won medals both times the discipline was held as an Olympic demonstration event; during the 1988 Winter Olympics in Calgary, Canada and the 1992 Winter Olympics in Albertville, France.

Rune Kristiansen 

Rune Kristiansen won a gold medal in ballet at the FIS Freestyle World Ski Championships 1995, and had a total of 38 World Cup victories throughout his career. He competed at the 1992 Winter Olympics in ski ballet, which was a demonstration event. He was Norwegian champion in ballet in 1985, 1986, 1987, 1988, 1989, 1990, 1992 and 1993.

George Fuehrmeier 
George Fuehrmeier competed in ski ballet during 1985. He gained popularity after a video of his routine was circulated on the Internet during the 2018 Winter Olympics.

Richard Schabl 
Richard Schabl was the FIS World Champion of 1986, and was considered the ultimate world champ. During his successful career as a freestyle skier, he invented the one handed pole flip and created many maneuvers that have revolutionized Freestyle Skiing.

Olympic demonstration sport 

Ski ballet was a demonstration sport in the 1988 and 1992 Winter Olympics. The sport has significantly declined in popularity in recent years due to the fact that it did not become an Olympic sport. The International Ski Federation ceased all formal competition of ski ballet after 2000.

See also 
 FIS Freestyle World Ski Championships
 FIS Freestyle Skiing World Cup
 Aerial skiing
 Mogul skiing
 Ski cross
 Half-pipe
 Slopestyle

References 

1960s in sports
Freestyle skiing
Types of skiing
Former Winter Olympic sports